James H. Broumel (died December 6, 1948) was an American politician from Maryland. He served as a member of the Maryland House of Delegates, representing Harford County, from 1931 to 1937.

Early life
James H. Broumel was born in Bel Air, Maryland. He attended Bel Air High School. He attended St. John's College. He graduated from the University of Baltimore School of Law in 1930.

Career
Broumel was a Democrat. He served as a member of the Maryland House of Delegates, representing Harford County, from 1931 to 1937.

Personal life
Broumel married Sara Stearns on January 2, 1932, in Aberdeen, Maryland. They had three sons, James Howard Jr., Thomas Price and Charles Wallace.

Broumel died on December 6, 1948, at the age of 41, at the home of Judge Walter W. Preston in Emmorton, Maryland. He was buried at St. Mary's Church in Emmorton.

References

Year of birth uncertain
1900s births
1948 deaths
People from Bel Air, Maryland
St. John's College (Annapolis/Santa Fe) alumni
University of Baltimore School of Law alumni
Democratic Party members of the Maryland House of Delegates